Hechtia podantha is a species of plant in the genus Hechtia. This species is endemic to Mexico.

References

podantha
Flora of Mexico